Air chief marshal Sir John Anthony Cheshire, born , is a retired senior Royal Air Force (RAF) commander.

RAF career
Born the son of Group Captain (later Air Chief Marshal Sir) Walter Cheshire, and educated at Ipswich School and Worksop College, Cheshire joined the Royal Air Force as an officer cadet at the RAF College Cranwell in 1961.  He was commissioned as a pilot officer on 17 December 1963, and was successively promoted to flying officer (17 December 1964) and to flight lieutenant (17 June 1966).  He was promoted to squadron leader on 1 July 1971, and to wing commander on 1 July 1977.

In the late 1970s, Cheshire served as Commander of the Special Forces Flight, and then joined the Air Plans Directorate of the Ministry of Defence.  He was appointed Commander of the Air Wing of the Royal Brunei Air Force (RBAirF) in Brunei Darussalam in 1980, for which he was appointed an Officer of the Order of the British Empire in the 1982 Birthday Honours.  He became the Station Commander at RAF Lyneham in 1982 and, after his promotion to group captain on 1 July, Group Captain Contingency Plans at Headquarters United Kingdom Air Forces.  He went on to be air attache in Moscow in 1987, and was promoted to air commodore on 1 January 1988.  He became Deputy Commandant of the RAF Staff College, Bracknell in 1990, and was appointed a Commander of the Order of the British Empire in the 1991 New Year Honours.  He was promoted to air vice marshal on 1 January 1992, and appointed Assistant Chief of Staff Policy and Requirements at the Supreme Headquarters Allied Powers Europe.  As an acting air marshal, he was appointed a Companion of the Order of the Bath in the 1994 New Year Honours list.  He was knighted a Knight Commander of the Order of the British Empire in the 1995 New Year Honours, and promoted to air marshal on 23 January 1995.  Appointed UK Military Representative to NATO in 1995, he was appointed Commander-in-Chief, Allied Forces Northwestern Europe on 11 March 1997, with a promotion to air chief marshal.  Cheshire retired in 2000.

Jersey and later life
In retirement, Cheshire was the Lieutenant Governor of Jersey from 24 January 2001 to 7 April 2006, when his term of office ended.  He was appointed chairman of the Royal Air Force Charitable Trust in July 2008.

Cheshire was married until the passing of his wife; he has a son and daughter, and three grandchildren.

On 22 April 2022, Cheshire was recognised with a road being named in his honour at the Royal Brunei Air Force Base, Rimba in Brunei.  Appearing at the road naming event by video link, Mohammad Sharif Ibrahim, the head of the Royal Brunei Air Force, named the road Cheshire Lane.

References

External links
Sir John Cheshire involved in NATO Reconstruction

|-

|-

Knights Commander of the Order of the British Empire
Knights of the Order of St John
Companions of the Order of the Bath
1942 births
Living people
Royal Air Force air marshals
Graduates of the Royal Air Force College Cranwell
Governors of Jersey
British air attachés